The Dancer is a 2000 English-language French drama film starring Mia Frye. It was written by Jessica Kaplan and Luc Besson (who also produced the film) and directed by Frédéric Garson. The film was first shown at the Cannes Film Festival on 19 May 2000.

Plot

A young, mute dancer is a huge success at her neighborhood in Brooklyn. She dreams to become a professional dancer and struggles to make the cut in an audition for a Broadway show.

Cast
 Mia Frye as India Rey
 Garland Whitt as Jasper Rey
 Rodney Eastman as Isaac
 Josh Lucas as Stephane
 Féodor Atkine as Oscar
 Jarrod Bunch as Bruno
 Cut Killer as DJ Atomic

Reception

Shannon J. Harvey from Urban Cinefile called it "an interesting indy project for Luc Besson" and wrote: "most audiences should love this short-lived melodrama, even if it leaves them wanting more."  Richard Scheib from Moria.co gave it two and a half stars and criticized several aspects of film, including the ending and dance numbers.

References

External links
 
 

English-language French films
2000s English-language films
2000s French films